Spearritt is a surname. Notable people with the surname include:

Eddie Spearritt (born 1947), English football player
Hannah Spearritt (born 1981), English actress and singer